Haveli Bahadur Shah is a town situated in Jhang, Punjab, Pakistan.

References

Populated places in Jhang District
Jhang District